Rajdeep Phogat is an Indian politician. He was elected to the Haryana Legislative Assembly from Dadri in the 2014 election, as a member of the Indian National Lok Dal.

He was one of the four MLAs who joined the Dushyant Chautala's Jannayak Janta Party after a split in Indian National Lok Dal.

He is currently serving as the Chairman, Housing Board, Government of Haryana.

References 

1967 births
Living people
Indian National Lok Dal politicians
Jannayak Janta Party politicians
Haryana MLAs 2014–2019